Clube de Desportos Vasco da Gama (known as both NRB Vasco Sports Club, and Vasco SC) is an Indian professional football club based in Vasco da Gama, Goa. Founded in 1951, the club is nicknamed "the Port Towners", and competes in the Goa Professional League.

Vasco has previously competed in the National Football League, then top tier of Indian football league system. The club also appeared in the I-League 2nd Division in later years.

History

Formation
In 1951, residents from the port town of Vasco da Gama, Goa, including the Portuguese garrison stationed there formed the club called Clube de Desportos Vasco da Gama.

It was named after the famous Brazilian club Club de Regatas Vasco da Gama, and similar colours were adopted by it. The open fields where the present Tilak Maidan Stadium and were the practice grounds for the players. Later a club house was built nearby, which still stands today.

Early years
During the last five decades the club participated in most of the major tournaments in India. The sixties and seventies were the most productive years for the club as they won some of the major tournaments during that time (Kerala Trophy, Stafford Cup, Chakola Gold Trophy and Sait-Nagjee Trophy). In 1968, it won the first edition of Goa Police Cup, and in 1969, it became the first Goan side to win Sait Nagjee Football Tournament defeating Border Security Force FC. It failed to win in other tournaments including Rovers Cup, Bordoloi Trophy and Nehru Memorial Tournament, having lost out in the several finals. In 1970, Vasco again became the first Goan side to win prestigious Bandodkar Gold Trophy, defeating Dempo 1–0.

During the late-60s and early-70s, Vasco was noted for having famous "A–B–C–D of Indian football", players Andrew D'Souza, Bernard Pereira, Catao Fernandes, and Dominic Pereira. As far as honors at home go, the club won the Goa Professional League title on six occasions starting in 1954 until 1969 and is the oldest registered club still participating in the state's top league competition. Vasco also became first Goan club to have won a tournament in Bombay, the WIFA Championship in 1966.

After two decades of major victories, the 1980s saw a decline in the efficacy of the club in terms of all Indian and state tournaments. However, it retained a prominent position among the top five clubs in Goa. The decline started when Bandekar group withdrew support and there were no new investors to fund the increasing cost of top class players.

From 1973 to 1975, Vasco was managed by legendary Indian goalkeeper Peter Thangaraj, and renowned goalkeeper E.N. Sudhir played for the club. The club clinched Stafford Challenge Cup title in 1973. Over the last five decades, the club has received a lot of financial help from many philanthropic individuals not only from Goa, but also Goans residing abroad.

Present years
Undaunted, from the mid 1990s, under the leadership of Nõel da Lima Leitão, the club appointed former S.L. Benfica star Zeca Miglietti as coach for its training programme. His hard work saw the Club reach the quarterfinal phase of the KBL Federation Cup and among the contenders for qualification to the Premier Division National League. British coach Bob Bootland took charge of the club in mid-90s and worked until 1998.

For several years, Vasco emerged as one of the strongest sides in Goan football and they are well known for signing some quality foreigners. Signing players form Uzbekistan by them were one of the hot topics as they roped in some players including Yorqin Nazarov, Anvar Jabborov, Ravshan Teshabaev, Azamat Abduraimov, Sherzod Nazarov, Kashimov Awazbek.

Vasco has participated in the National Football League II or the second division for several times and in the 1999–00 season, they emerged as runners-up. In the 2002–03 National Football League, Vasco finished third on league table and they thrashed HAL SC 8–0, making it the biggest ever win for the club on margin.

In September 2000, they reached final of Tirur All-India Football Tournament in Tirur, Kerala, but finished as runners-up, losing 5–4 to Indian Bank Recreational Club.

Vasco debuted in the I-League during the 2008–09 season, but it was a though time for them as they finished on bottom of the league table with 10 points in 22 matches. Vasco last competed in the top flight of domestic football; I-League, during the 2009–10 season.

In the 2010 I-League 2nd Division, Vasco entered into the final round, achieving third place with 13 points from 7 matches. For the first time in history, Vasco got relegated from Goa Professional League in 2012–13 Goa Professional League season. In August 2018, they roped in former India international Micky Fernandes as their new head coach.

In the 2020–21 season, Goa Football Association held the qualifying tournament through Goa Professional League. After no interest from winners and runners-up, Vasco requested to the state association for nomination for the 2021–22 I-League 2nd Division.

Sponsorship
Vasco Sports Club has a new title sponsor in the local NRB Group and the team would be from now on known as NRB Vasco. This was announced in the Goan clubs Club House. The club was formerly sponsored by Chowgule Group.

The initial deal was of one-year duration which was announced by the NRB managing director Narayan Bandekar, who hope to help the club qualify for the I-League after years in the 2nd Division.

Vasco SC president Nitin Bandekar and vice-president Vinod Parkot with local Vasco MLA and KYC Chairman Carlos Almeida, Vasco SC CEO Ajay Patil, former club president Vinod Parkot, the ex-Goa FA secretary Savio Messias and Nayan Tara Lima Leitao were attended during the press meeting to let everyone about the sponsorship for the betterment of the management of the club.

Stadium

Vasco S.C. used the Tilak Maidan Stadium in Vasco, Goa, for their home matches of the National Football League, I-League 2nd Division and Goa Professional League. The stadium has a capacity of nearly 5,000 spectators. They also use Duler Stadium for some of their home games.

The club also used Fatorda Stadium in Margao for some of their home games.

Current squad

First-team players

Notable players
For all current and former notable players of Vasco with a Wikipedia article, see: Vasco SC players.

Honours

League
 National Football League
Third place (3): 2001–02, 2002–03
 National Football League II
Runners-up (1): 1999–00
 I-League 2nd Division
Runners-up (1): 2008
Third place (2): 2010, 2011
 Goa Professional League
Champions (3): 1964–65, 1966–67, 1968–69

Cup
 Sait Nagjee Trophy
Champions (1): 1969
 Rovers Cup
Runners-up (2): 1966–67, 1971–72
 Goa Police Cup
Champions (4): 1968, 1969, 1977, 2010
 Bordoloi Trophy
Runners-up (1): 1974
Bandodkar Gold Trophy
Champions (2): 1971, 1975
Runners-up (1): 1981

Others
Stafford Challenge Cup
Champions (1): 1973
 WIFA Championship
Champions (1): 1966
Kerala Trophy
Champions (2): 1968, 1969
KFA Shield
Champions (1): 1973
Chakola Gold Trophy
Champions (1): 1973
 Guru Gobind Singh Trophy
Champions (1): 1999
Goa Governor's Cup
Champions (1): 2004
Runners-up (1): 2000
Mammen Mappillai Trophy
Champions (1): 1976 
Runners-up (1): 1979
OIL Challenge Gold Cup
Champions (1): 2007
Mini Rovers Cup
Champions (1): 1993
 Tirur All-India Football Tournament
Runners-up (1): 2000
Puttiah Memorial Trophy
Runners-up (1): 1978
Abhijit Kadam Memorial Cup
Runners-up (1): 2008
Kalinga Cup
Runners-up (1): 2012

See also
 List of Goan State Football Champions
 List of football clubs in Goa
 Goa Professional League

References

Further reading

External links

 Vasco SC official website

 Team profile at Soccerway
 Team info at Global Sports Archive

 
Association football clubs established in 1951
Football clubs in Goa
I-League clubs
I-League 2nd Division clubs
1951 establishments in Portuguese India
Vasco da Gama, Goa